Craig Allen is a former Guernsey association football striker who played professionally in the North American Soccer League and Major Indoor Soccer League.

Professional
In 1979, the nineteen-year-old Allen came to California on vacation. While in California, he attended an open tryout with the California Surf of the North American Soccer League and gained a contract offer. Over three years, he played three NASL outdoor and two NASL indoor seasons with the Surf. In 1981, he moved to the New Jersey Rockets of the Major Indoor Soccer League. After one season, he moved to the Cleveland Force where he played for six seasons. In 1988, the Force lost to the San Diego Sockers in the MISL championship. In Jun 1988, the Force released Allen. By this time he had played 254 league games, scored 275 goals and added 180 assists with Cleveland.

National team
In March 1993, Allen scored a record 7 goals for Guernsey in their 10–0 win against Alderney in the semi-final of the Muratti Vase. This was his first Muratti-appearance since 1978. (Although he failed to find the net in the final as Guernsey lost 1–2 against Jersey).

Personal life
Craig's son, Ross Allen, is also a competitive footballer, and was named Guernsey Football Association Division One Player of the Year for 2008–09. He currently plays for Guernsey in the Isthmian League Division One South. In August 2011 he was allegedly scouted by Swindon Town.

References

External links
Allen's NASL/MISL statistics and photograph from nasljerseys.com

Living people
California Surf players
Cleveland Force (original MISL) players
Expatriate soccer players in the United States
Association football forwards
Guernsey expatriate footballers
Guernsey expatriates in the United States
Guernsey footballers
English footballers
Major Indoor Soccer League (1978–1992) players
North American Soccer League (1968–1984) indoor players
New Jersey Rockets (MISL) players
North American Soccer League (1968–1984) players
1959 births
English expatriate sportspeople in the United States
English expatriate footballers